Lancaster Country Club is a private country club in Lancaster, Pennsylvania. The club was the host venue for the 2015 U.S. Women's Open. The Pennsylvania Open in 2002 and 2007, local qualifying for the 2008 U.S. Women's Open, and many prestigious amateur tournaments have also been held at the club.

Lancaster Country Club will host the U.S. Women's Open in 2024.

Wayne Morrison is the authoritative Flynn historian with the published biography The Nature Faker labelling Lancaster Country Club as Flynn's first great golf course.

Lancaster has 3 distinct nine-hole courses named Meadowcreek, Dogwood and Highlands. The Old Course, which the U.S. Women's Open was contested, is made up of the Meadowcreek and Dogwood nines.  In 2007, golf architects Ron Forse and Jim Nagle restored Lancaster design back to Flynn's original plans.

The club is located outside the northeast limits of Lancaster city, partly in Manheim Township and (across the Conestoga River) partly in East Lampeter Township, both in Lancaster County, Pennsylvania.

References

External links
 Official website

Golf clubs and courses in Pennsylvania
Buildings and structures in Lancaster County, Pennsylvania
Sports in Lancaster, Pennsylvania
1900 establishments in Pennsylvania